Bull Lake is a lake in geographic Turner Township in Sudbury District, Ontario, Canada. The primary outflow is an unnamed creek to an unnamed lake on the Yorston River, a tributary of the Sturgeon River, between Long Lake upstream and Seagram Lake downstream. Little Bull Lake is immediately upstream of Bull Lake, and is connected by a short unnamed stream.

References

Lakes of Sudbury District